Madhuca mindanaensis is a tree in the family Sapotaceae. It is named after Mindanao in the Philippines.

Description
The bark is greyish brown. Inflorescences bear up to nine flowers.

Distribution and habitat
Madhuca mindanaensis is native to Borneo and the Philippines. Its habitat is mixed dipterocarp forests to  altitude.

References

mindanaensis
Trees of Borneo
Trees of the Philippines
Plants described in 1915